Marvin Schick (July 3, 1934 – April 23, 2020) was a Hunter College and New School for Social Research political science and constitutional law professor. He was also known for his work in Jewish education.

Career
Schick was a professor at Hunter College and New School for Social Research, where he taught political-science and constitutional law. He was president of the Rabbi Jacob Joseph School, for over 30 years, and was an educational consultant for the Avi Chai Foundation and has been described as an expert on Jewish Day Schools.

Schick founded National Jewish Commission on Law and Public Affairs (COLPA) in 1965, and served as its first president. He served in the second mayoral administration of NYC Mayor John V. Lindsay (1969–1973) (about which he wrote in 2000 "the first time ... and probably the last time" ) as liaison to the Jewish community  and a Mayoral Spokesman  and administrative assistant.

His writings have appeared in The Jewish Press and The Jewish Week.

Personal
He was born the day before his twin brother Allen (by 15 minutes) on July 3, 1934, and died on April 23, 2020.

His father died before his 4th birthday.  His mother, Rebbetzin Renee Schick, founded the Schick's Bakery in Boro Park in 1941, to help support her family.

See also 

 Learned Hand
 The Failure To Teach Political Activity  by Marvin Schick, Albert Somit
 Marvin Schick's Blog

References

1934 births
2020 deaths
American columnists
American political consultants
Jewish American writers
Jewish education in the United States
Hunter College faculty
The New School faculty
21st-century American Jews